Willian Pozo-Venta Angell (born 27 August 1997) is a Cuban footballer who plays as a winger or attacker for Notodden. A former youth international for Norway, Pozo-Venta represents the Cuba national team.

Club career
In 2015, Pozo-Venta trialed for Stoke City in the English Premier League after playing for the youth academy of French Ligue 1 side Metz. Before the 2018 season, he signed for Zimbru Chișinău in Moldova from Norwegian Second Division club Follo. Before the 2020 season, he signed for Strømmen in the Norwegian First Division from the reserves of Polish second division team Stomil Olsztyn. On 27 August 2021, he moved to Notodden in the Norwegian Second Division.

International career
Born in Cuba, Pozo-Venta moved to Norway at the age of 4. He was a youth international for Norway. He made his debut with the Cuba national team in a 5-0 2022 FIFA World Cup qualification win over British Virgin Islands on 2 June 2021.

References

External links
 
 
 
 
 
 Stomil Olsztyn Profile

1997 births
Living people
Sportspeople from Havana
Cuban footballers
Cuba international footballers
Norwegian footballers
Norway youth international footballers
Norwegian people of Cuban descent
Association football wingers
Follo FK players
FC Zimbru Chișinău players
Strømmen IF players
Notodden FK players
Norwegian Second Division players
Moldovan Super Liga players
Norwegian First Division players
Association football forwards
Norwegian expatriate footballers
Expatriate footballers in France
Expatriate footballers in Moldova
Expatriate footballers in Poland
Cuban expatriate sportspeople in France
Cuban expatriate sportspeople in Moldova
Cuban expatriate sportspeople in Poland
Norwegian expatriate sportspeople in France
Norwegian expatriate sportspeople in Moldova
Norwegian expatriate sportspeople in Poland